KSAK is the FM campus radio station of the Mt. San Antonio College in Walnut, California. The station once broadcast a professionally programmed format designed to represent what actually goes on in the radio industry, instead of alternative programming typically found on most college radio stations. Broadcasters and producers from local commercial radio stations teach classes at the college and supervise students who produce and announce news and music programming. The station broadcasts music in alternating blocks of hip-hop, alternative rock, and pop music, interspersed with news and public service announcements.

History

On December 21, 1972, the Mount San Antonio Community College District received the construction permit for 90.1 FM, broadcasting with 3.5 watts. The station went on the air January 2, 1974, after being a carrier current station.
In fall 2011, the station was rebranded as "90.1 FM MtRock" after a management change at the college. The station is currently a rock format, playing rock from 1960 to today, as well as music from local Los Angeles artists and is operated by students at the college.

References

External links
mtrockradio.com

FCC History Cards for KSAK

SAK-FM
SAK
Radio stations established in 1974
1974 establishments in California